Ahmet Saffet Okay (1876 – 18 May 1938) was a Turkish admiral and politician, who played a crucial role during the Dardanelles Campaign in World War I. He was the commander of , the Ottoman destroyer that sank .

References

1876 births
1938 deaths
20th-century Turkish politicians
Ottoman people of World War I
Military personnel from Istanbul
Republican People's Party (Turkey) politicians
Turkish admirals
Politicians from Istanbul